Hascall is a surname of English origin. Notable people with the surname include:

Augustus P. Hascall (1800–1872), American politician, surveyor, lawyer and judge
Charles C. Hascall (1796–1862), American newspaper publisher and politician
Milo Smith Hascall (1829–1904), American soldier, banker and real estate executive
Isaac S. Hascall (1831–1908), American politician, lawyer, and judge from Nebraska

References

Surnames of English origin